Voroshilov Sharpshooter or Voroshilov Marksman (Voroshilov Shooter) was an honorary title and a badge for marksmanship introduced in 1932 by  OSOAVIAKhIM, Soviet Union. It was named after Kliment Voroshilov. 

Issued by OSOAVIAKhIM, it was a civil decoration. A variant, with text "РККА" (RKKA) instead of ОСОАВИАХИМ, was also issued in the Red Army.

References

Marksmanship
Awards established in 1932
Civil awards and decorations of the Soviet Union
Military awards and decorations of the Soviet Union